The SS John Sherman, originally the USRC Sherman or USRC John Sherman was built for the United States Revenue Cutter Service in 1865 before being disposed of by the United States Government in 1872. It  was a United States sidewheeler ship initially used as a Revenue Cutter on the Great Lakes of North America before being used for ferry service across Lake Michigan between the states of Michigan and Wisconsin. In 1874 the ship was chartered by Flint and Pere Marquette Railroad to become the first ship used by the company transporting freight and passengers.

Description

History 

On November 11, 1866, the schooner George Worthington (initially reported as the George Washington) was carrying iron ore ran into difficulties and went ashore at the mouth of Cleveland harbor with 2 of the 8 crew drowning in the process. The Sherman started pulling on the Worthington on November 12, hauling it off on November 15, and towing her into port.

On November 7, 1867, the Sherman refloated the schooner J. F. Prince after it had been driven ashore near the water works in Cleveland on the previous day. The Prince was then towed into port by the tug Levi Johnson.

Around June 23, 1871, the Canadian schooner Denmark ran aground on the shore of Lake Eire at Rond Eau or Rondeau in Ontario, Canada. After several days of unsuccessful attempts to refloat the Denmark, the Sherman steamed to the location and the Denmark was refloated and under way again shortly afterwards. The owners of the Denmark offered payment which was declined, after which they sent a letter to the newspapers praising the work of the Sherman.

The USRC Sherman was sold to a private buyer in Cleveland on June 25, 1872 and in July, the Sherman was slightly damaged when she went ashore at Bois Blanc on the Detroit River in Ontario, Canada. Then in October the Sherman suffered an engine failure whilst sailing on Lake Michigan and needed to be towed to Chicago. After this she was refitted and became the SS John Sherman. In 1873 it was then sold to a group of people including D. Cole by the company River & Lake Shore for $18,357.

The John Sherman had already started a ferry service across Lake Michigan in 1873 when the Flint and Pere Marquette Railroad hired the cross-lake ferry service from Ludington, Michigan to Sheboygan, Wisconsin, on June 25, 1874. They then initiated a public commercial package freight service across Lake Michigan on May 31, 1875. It shuttled packaged freight, grain, and people across Lake Michigan between Ludington and Sheboygan, Wisconsin under the command of Captain John W. Steward.

After the one season in 1875 the vessel was found to be too small for the volume of freight on the route and was discontinued. The craft was then rebuilt in 1877 as a passenger steamer operating out of Detroit. 

In 1878 the Sherman was sold to J.P. Clark and W.O. Ashley of Detroit who removed the engines to be used in the boat Alaska, then in 1890 boat Frank E. Kirby, and turned the Sherman into a barge to carry lumbar before being scrapped in 1893.

References

Sources

External links 

Pere Marquette Historical Society

Pere Marquette Railway
Ships of the United States Revenue Cutter Service
Great Lakes ships
1865 ships